Cinema is the fifth studio album of eclectic Australian band, The Cat Empire. It was released in Australia on 25 June 2010 by EMI and débuted at No. 3 on the ARIA Albums Chart. The work was co-produced by Steve Schram with the group.

Background 
The Cat Empire's fifth studio album, Cinema, was issued on 25 June 2010 by EMI in Australia. It was followed by releases in Canada, United States, and then Europe. It was co-produced by Steve Schram and the group. According to the band's lead vocalist and percussionist, [Felix Riebl], its title was due to the content, which "is very cinematic, simply put ... Another way to describe it is that it is like a soundtrack to a movie that we might make one day. When [Schram] and I were sitting around and trying to come up with a title we thought that the name we eventually chose would suit the atmosphere".

Cinema débuted at number three on the ARIA Albums Chart. The track, "Beyond All", was featured on national radio station, Triple J's New Music with Richard Kingsmill in April. The lead single, "Feeling's Gone", had been released in May ahead of the album. A promotional copy of Cinema had been leaked to eBay about three weeks before its due date and sold for $200; EMI provided a statement regarding the leak. To promote the album the group undertook a tour on North America in July followed by a national tour in August and September.

Track listing

Personnel 

The Cat Empire core members
 Harry James Angus – vocals, trumpet
 Will Hull-Brown – drums
 Jamshid Khadiwhala – turntables, hand percussion
 Ollie McGill – piano, keyboards
 Ryan Monro – bass guitar
 Felix Riebl – lead vocals, congas, percussion, piano

The Empire Horns (auxiliary members)
 Kieran Conrau – trombone
 Ross Irwin – trumpet
 Phil Noy – baritone saxophone (tracks 3, 7, 9), soprano saxophone (track 5)
Recording details
 Produced by – Steve Schram, The Cat Empire
 Mixing – Steve Schram
 Engineering – Steve Schram
 Assistant engineering – Gareth "Grif" Burnell, Anna Webster, Mick Rafferty
 Mastered by – Ross Cockle
 Studio – Sing Sing Studios (engineering, mastering); Bangkok Ninja Academy (mixing)

Charts

References

External links
The Cat Empire official website
The Empire Ship Fan Blog article about Cinema

2010 albums
The Cat Empire albums